Yevgeny Aleksandrovich Ivanushkin (born 26 July 1979 in Krasnoturinsk) is a Russian bandy player who is currently playing for Dynamo Moscow and has been part of the Russia national bandy team in many world championship competitions. In 2017 he became the second player, after Sergey Lomanov Jr., to score 1 000 goals in Russian Bandy Super League.

Career
Ivanushkin has played with Mayak, Sibskana-Energiya/Baykal-Energiya, Vodnik Arkhangelsk and Dynamo Moscow.

References

External links
 
 

1979 births
Living people
Russian bandy players
Dynamo Mayak players
Baykal-Energiya players
Vodnik Arkhangelsk players
Dynamo Moscow players
Bandy World Championship-winning players